Chaman-e Golin (also Romanized as Chaman-e Golīn; also known as Chaman) is a village in Direh Rural District, in the Central District of Gilan-e Gharb County, Kermanshah Province, Iran. At the 2006 census, its population was 149, in 36 families.

References 

Populated places in Gilan-e Gharb County